Ctenoceratoda is a genus of moths of the family Noctuidae.

Species
 Ctenoceratoda sukharevae (Varga, 1974)

References
Natural History Museum Lepidoptera genus database
Ctenoceratoda at funet

Hadeninae